Keatley may refer to:

People
Charlotte Keatley (born 1960), English playwright
Gina Keatley CDN, American nutritionist, media personality, and television host
Greg Keatley (born 1953), former Major League Baseball catcher who played for one season
Ian Keatley (born 1987), Irish rugby union player
John H. Keatley (1838–1905), American newspaper editor, politician, and judge
Zilpha Keatley Snyder (1927–2014), American author of books for children and young adults

Geography
Keatley, Saskatchewan, unincorporated community in Douglas Rural Municipality No. 436, Saskatchewan, Canada
Keatley Creek, left tributary of the Fraser River in the Interior of British Columbia, Canada
Keatley Creek Archaeological Site, in the interior of British Columbia and in the traditional territory of the St'at'imc people

See also
Keathley
Keighley
Ketley